Garbiñe Muguruza and Carla Suárez Navarro were the defending champions, but they chose not to participate this year.

Karolína Plíšková and Barbora Strýcová won the title, defeating Vania King and Alla Kudryavtseva in the final, 6–3, 7–6(7–1).

Seeds

Draw

Draw

References
 Main Draw

Aegon Classicandnbsp;- Doubles
Doubles